Brian James Hillery (22 November 1937 – 19 January 2021) was an Irish Fianna Fáil politician and finance executive who served as a Senator from 1977 to 1982, 1983 to 1989 and 1992 to 1997 and a Teachta Dála (TD) for the Dún Laoghaire constituency from 1989 to 1992.

Academic and political career
Hillery studied at University College Dublin (UCD) and the University of Georgia and worked in banking before joining the UCD faculty in 1967. He became the inaugural ESSO Professor of Industrial Relations in 1974.

Hillery's uncle, Patrick Hillery, was a Fianna Fáil TD and Minister until 1973, and President of Ireland from 1976 to 1990. In 1977, Brian Hillery was elected to the 14th Seanad as a Fianna Fáil Senator for the Administrative Panel. Minister Gene Fitzgerald's 1978 suggestion that he chair the Commission on Industrial Relations was rejected by the Irish Congress of Trade Unions as party-political. After unsuccessfully contesting the 1981 general election in Dún Laoghaire, he was returned to the 15th Seanad, serving from 1981–1982. He did not sit in the brief 16th Seanad, but was re-elected to the 17th Seanad in 1983, where he served until he was elected a TD for Dún Laoghaire at the 1987 general election. At the 1992 general election, he lost his Dáil seat, which Barry Desmond attributed to a lack of constituency work. He was then nominated to the 20th Seanad by Taoiseach Albert Reynolds. He resigned as Senator in May 1994 when he was appointed to the European Bank for Reconstruction and Development (EBRD).

Public and private sector board member
From 1994 to 1997, Hillery was an executive director at the EBRD in London representing Ireland and Denmark. He then became a director and, from 1999, chairman, of UniCredit's Irish operations at the Dublin International Financial Services Centre. Public sector advisory bodies on which Hillery served include the Government Review Body on Higher Remuneration in the Public Sector (1999–2007), the National Pensions Reserve Fund Commission (2004–2014), and the Irish commission of the Fulbright Program (2002–2004). He was a director of the Central Bank of Ireland and Financial Regulator from April 2008 until the bodies were reformed in October 2010. The Oireachtas joint committee of inquiry into the post-2008 banking crisis initially intended to ask him to make a statement but did not proceed with this.

Hillery was founding chairman from 1997 to 2015 of Providence Resources, a hydrocarbon company established by Tony O'Reilly. In 2003, he was appointed to the board of Independent News & Media, succeeding Tony O'Reilly as chairman in 2009 while O'Reilly remained chief executive. Hillery resigned in 2011 in the face of pressure from Denis O'Brien.

He died in January 2021.

References

1937 births
2021 deaths
Fianna Fáil TDs
Members of the 14th Seanad
Members of the 15th Seanad
Members of the 17th Seanad
Members of the 18th Seanad
Members of the 26th Dáil
Members of the 20th Seanad
People from Dún Laoghaire
People from County Clare
Nominated members of Seanad Éireann
Fianna Fáil senators
Independent News & Media
Alumni of University College Dublin
Academics of University College Dublin
University of Georgia alumni